Jaya Parvati Vrat, a Hindu festival in India, is observed in Ashada Maas by unmarried girls and married women in Gujarat and some other Western India parts. This vrat is observed for five days a year for 5, 7, 9, or maybe even 11 years.

Description

 (the story or legend of ) is associated with a Brahmin woman who observed this  to get her husband free from his curse(was not really a curse). The divine couple Lord Shiva and Goddess Parvati is worshipped during this .

There was a Brahmin couple. They were devotees of Lord Shiva. They had everything in their life but a child. They used to worship Lord Shiva every day in the temple. Lord Shiva was propitiated with the devotion of the couple and there was a revelation which said "My Shiva Linga is at a certain place in the jungle. No body is performing its puja. If you go there and perform its puja, then your wishes will be fulfilled." The Brahmin couple was pleased when they heard this. They went to the jungle and found out the place where Lord Shiva's Shiva Linga was. The couple found the Linga and the Brahmin went in search for flowers to perform the puja, where he was bitten by a snake and fell unconscious. His wife got worried as her husband did not return and went in search for him. She prayed intensely for her husband's safety. Lord Shiva saw the true devotion of the Brahmin woman and brought her husband back to consciousness. Later, the couple prayed at the Linga and they were blessed with a son.

Vrat
When observing , one cannot eat tomatoes, spices, salt, and vegetables. It is believed that Jaya Parvati vrat brings happiness and blesses the girl with a good husband and a happy married life.

Prayers are then offered to the  pot. A  (a necklace made from cotton wool) is decorated with vermillion. This ritual is carried out every morning and the wheat seeds are watered.

References

Vrata
Gujarati culture
Hindu festivals
Festivals in India